This is a list of the tallest dams in the United States. Dimensions given are for foundation height, not hydraulic height or head. Structures such as levees, dikes and tailings dams are not included in the lists. Decommissioned or failed dams, such as Teton Dam in Idaho, are included. Both lists are works in progress and will be updated periodically with new information. There are currently 75 entries on the main list.

Most of the U.S.'s taller dams are located in the west because of the steeper and more rugged topography. The tallest is Oroville Dam in northern California, a  embankment dam completed in 1968. Five of the ten tallest dams in the U.S. are located in California. The Colorado, Columbia and Sacramento–San Joaquin river systems contain the greatest number of tall dams. In the eastern U.S., tall dams are less common because of the lesser vertical relief. The tallest dam in the eastern U.S. is  Fontana Dam in North Carolina, which ranks 20th in height among all U.S. dams.

Tallest dams

Tallest dams by state

Location map

See also
List of largest reservoirs in the United States
List of world's tallest dams

References

External links
10 Highest Dams in the United States (Archived 2009-10-31)

United States Dams
United States
Tallest